The EMD SD22ECO is a  C-C diesel-electric locomotive rebuilt by Electro-Motive Diesel.  It is, along with the GP22ECO, primarily the application of a conversion kit to an existing EMD SD40-type locomotive.  This involves replacing the existing prime mover with an EPA Tier-II-compliant turbocharged V8 710G3A, with electronic fuel injection.  The prime mover is mated to an AR10 alternator for traction power, a CA6 alternator for control power, and a computerized control system. This conversion does not alter the external appearance of the locomotive.

References 
 SD22ECO advertisement by EMD.  Retrieved on 
 710ECO Repower Solutions by EMD.  Retrieved on

External links 
 Railroad Picture Archives – Photographs of the EMD SD22ECO.

C-C locomotives
SD22ECO
Electro-Motive Division locomotives
Diesel-electric locomotives of the United States
EPA Tier 2-compliant locomotives of the United States
Rebuilt locomotives
Standard gauge locomotives of the United States